Eagle Bay may refer to:

 Eagle Bay, British Columbia, Canada
 Eagle Bay, New York, United States
 Eagle Bay, Western Australia, Australia